Maes y Dre Recreation Ground is a multi-use stadium in Welshpool, Powys, Wales.  It is currently used mostly for football matches and is the home ground of Welshpool Town F.C. It is also used for some cricket matches.

The stadium has a capacity of 3,000.

References

Football venues in Wales
Stadiums in Wales
Buildings and structures in Powys
Multi-purpose stadiums in the United Kingdom